Parrish Glacier is a glacier on central Ellesmere Island, Nunavut, Canada.

References

Glaciers of Qikiqtaaluk Region
Ellesmere Island
Arctic Cordillera